

Plants

Ferns and fern allies

Angiosperms

Arthropods

Insects

Tetrapodomorphs

Amphibians

Newly named temnospondylians

Newly named amphibians

Ichthyosaurs

Lepidosauromorphs

Newly named basal lepidosauromorphs

Newly named plesiosaurs

Newly named squamates

Turtles

Archosauromorphs

Newly named crurotarsans

Newly named dinosaurs
 Vickaryous, M K., 2006, New information on the cranial anatomy of Edmontonia rugosidens Gilmore, a Late Cretaceous nodosaurid dinosaur from Dinosaur Provincial Park, Alberta: JVP, v. 26, n. 4: 1011–1013.

Data are courtesy of George Olshevky's dinosaur genera list.

Newly named birds

Newly named pterosaurs

Synapsids

Non-mammalian

Mammals

Trace fossils 
 The trace fossil genera Nihilichnus (Nihilichnus nihilicus and Nihilichnus mortalis), Machichnus (Machichnus regularis, Machichnus multilineatus, and Machichnus bohemicus) and Brutalichnus (Brutalichnus brutalis) are described from bite traces.

References

 
2000s in paleontology
Paleontology